Seltorexant, also known by its developmental code names MIN-202 and JNJ-42847922, is an orexin antagonist medication which is under development for the treatment of depression and insomnia. It is a selective antagonist of the orexin OX2 receptor (2-SORA). The medication is taken by mouth. As of February 2022, seltorexant is in phase 3 clinical trials for treatment of major depressive disorder (MDD) and phase 2 trials for treatment of insomnia. It was also under investigation for the treatment of sleep apnea, but no recent development has been reported for this indication. Seltorexant is under development by Minerva Neurosciences and Johnson & Johnson's Janssen Pharmaceuticals.

Seltorexant is being explored at doses of 5 to 80mg. In the early clinical trials conducted so far, seltorexant has been found to improve depression scores on the Hamilton Depression Rating Scale in people with MDD and to improve sleep onset, total sleep time, time awake after sleep onset, and sleep efficiency in people with MDD and/or insomnia. Seltorexant is reported to be safe and well-tolerated. Side effects of seltorexant observed in clinical trials so far have included somnolence, fatigue, dizziness, headache, abdominal discomfort, and nightmares.

Seltorexant shows over 100-fold greater binding affinity for the OX2 receptor over the OX1 receptor. This is in contrast to other orexin receptor antagonists like suvorexant, lemborexant, and daridorexant, which are all dual orexin receptor antagonists (DORAs). Seltorexant has fast absorption with a time to peak levels of 0.3 to 1.5hours and has a relatively short duration with an elimination half-life of only 2 to 3hours. No residual effects of the medication were observed 4hours after daytime administration. The pharmacokinetics of seltorexant are considered to be ideal for sleep induction. Seltorexant is metabolized by the cytochrome P450 enzyme CYP3A4. It is a small-molecule compound and is structurally related to other clinically used orexin receptor antagonists.

See also
 Vornorexant – another investigational short-acting orexin receptor antagonist
 List of investigational antidepressants § Orexin receptor antagonists
 List of investigational sleep drugs § Orexin receptor antagonists

References

External links
 Seltorexant — AdisInsight

Aminopyrimidines
Antidepressants
Experimental drugs
Fluoroarenes
Hypnotics
Ketones
Orexin antagonists
Pyrroles
Triazoles